The 2013 USASA National Women's Open was the 18th staging of the tournament, and the first under a new format that eliminates regional qualification.  The finals included four Midwest teams and took place from June 25th to 27th, with the Amateur and U-23 competitions taking place the next three days.

The defending champions are the Chicago Red Stars who were the first professional team to enter, and win, the competition.  They did not attempt to defend their title, participating in the inaugural season of the National Women's Soccer League instead.  They were members of WPSL Elite during the 2012 edition of the Women's Cup.

The four teams participating in the Open Bracket of the 2013 National Women's Championships were the Des Moines Menace, Kansas City Shock, Houston Aces, and Kansas City Dynamos, the competition format being a round-robin as opposed to the previous used semifinals-to-final.  The Houston Aces emerged as champions, winning all three of their matches, with the Kansas City Dynamos as runners-up.

Schedule

Final standings

References

2013
Open
United